Genetic structure refers to any pattern in the genetic makeup of individuals within a population.

Genetic structure allows for information about an individual to be inferred from other members of the same population. In trivial terms, all populations have genetic structure, because all populations can be characterised by their genotype or allele frequencies: if only 1% of a large sample of moths drawn from a single population have spotted wings, then it is safe to assume that any unknown individual is unlikely to have spotted wings.

A more complicated example arises in dense thickets of plants, where plants tend to be pollinated by near neighbours, and seeds tend to fall and germinate near the maternal plant. In such a scenario, plants tend to be more closely related to nearby plants than they are to distant plants; and yet they are more likely to breed with nearby plants than they are with distant plants. Thus an inbreeding cycle is created that perpetuates the pattern of plants being closely related to near neighbors. This is a form of genetic structure because one can infer much about the genetic makeup of any individual plant simply by studying plants in their immediate neighborhoods.

References

Genetics